Vesania (Latin for "insanity") is a Polish extreme metal band formed in 1997 by Orion, Daray and Heinrich. Later members were Annahvahr and Hatrah, who left the band in 1999 and was replaced by Siegmar.

Their first release, Moonastray, was a split with Black Altar, released in 2002 by Odium Records exclusively in Poland. The release was limited to 666 copies and each CD was signed with blood. 2003 saw the release across Europe of their first full-length album, Firefrost Arcanum, by Empire Records. This was followed by the departure of band member Annahvahr. Their second album, God the Lux, was released in April 2005, and shortly thereafter Valeo (Sammath Naur, Mortis Dei) joined the band as lead guitarist. Their third album, Distractive Killusions, was released in 2007 on Napalm Records, from which came their first single "Rage of Reason". 

The vocals include screaming and low growling.

Members

Current 
 Tomasz "Orion" Wróblewski – guitar, vocals (1997–present)
 Dariusz "Daray" Brzozowski – drums, percussion (1997–present)
 Filip "Heinrich" Hałucha – bass (1997–present)
 Krzysztof "Siegmar" Oloś – keyboards (2000–present)

Former 
 Hatrah – keyboards (1998–1999)
 Filip "Annahvahr" Żołyński – guitar, vocals (1998–2003)
 Marcin "Valeo" Walenczykowski – guitar (2005–2018; died 2018)

Live 
 Sławomir "Mortifer" Arkhangelsky (family name Kusterka) – guitar (2003; died 2013)
 Kerim "Krimh" Lechner – drums

Discography 
Studio albums

 Demos

 Other releases

References

External links 

 Vesania's Official website
 Vesania at YouTube

Polish musical groups
Polish heavy metal musical groups
Polish black metal musical groups
Polish symphonic metal musical groups
Blackened death metal musical groups
Symphonic black metal musical groups
Musical groups established in 1997
Napalm Records artists
Mystic Production artists